The Head of the Kabardino-Balkarian Republic, formerly President of the Kabardino-Balkarian Republic, is the highest office within the Government of Kabardino-Balkarian Republic, Russia and the Head of State and Head of Government of the KBR.

References

 
Politics of Kabardino-Balkaria
Kabardino-Balkaria